Valon is an Albanian male given name meaning "wave" (Albanian:Valë) or more particularly "waving" as an adjective.

People

 Valon Ahmedi (born 1994), Albanian football player
 Valon Behrami (born 1985), Swiss football player
 Valon Berisha (born 1993), Norwegian football player
 Valon Saracini (born 1981), the Minister of Economy of Macedonia
 Valon Xhukolli, housemate on the Albanian Big Brother television series

Places 
 Occitan for Gard, a department in southern France in the Languedoc-Roussillon region

Fictional characters
 Valon (Yu-Gi-Oh! character), character in the anime and manga series, Yu-Gi-Oh!

See also 
 Vallon (disambiguation)

Masculine given names
Albanian masculine given names